Katie Ann Redford (born 2 March 1989) is an English actress, writer and playwright. Since 2017, she has portrayed the role of Lily Pargetter in the BBC Radio 4 soap opera The Archers, as well as making appearances in television series including Doctors as Bethany Morris and Still Open All Hours as Beth. She also played characters in Young Hyacinth and Mount Pleasant. Redford is also a writer, having written an audio drama Yellow Lips in 2021 and her debut play Tapped in 2022.

Career 
Redford was born in Stapleford, Nottinghamshire. She began her career working behind the scenes of the BBC soap opera Doctors as a runner. At the beginning of her acting career, she appeared in several short films including Pitfall, Turn Your Bloody Phone Off: American Blood, Turn Off Your Bloody Phone - Film 4 Frightfest: The Dark Heart of Cinema and Norm. In 2015, Redford was cast as Bethany Platt in the ITV soap opera Coronation Street. However she was sacked before filming after it emerged that Redford had lied about her age and said she was 19 when she was in fact 25, in order to play 14-year-old Bethany in the show, a character 11 years her junior. The role was recast to Lucy Fallon instead.  Redford later said that she did not want to be in Coronation Street and received online abuse on social media. Redford has also played Lisa in the film Urban Hymn and Cazzy in the fifth series of the comedy Mount Pleasant. In 2016, she played Rose Walton in Young Hyacinth, the prequel to Keeping Up Appearances.

In 2017, Redford returned to Doctors, this time in an acting role as Bethany Morris, appearing in four episodes. Redford was then cast as Lily Pargetter in the BBC Radio 4 soap opera The Archers and was then cast in the role of Beth in Still Open All Hours and appeared until 2019. In 2018, she co-wrote and appeared in the short film Ghosted alongside Alison Steadman. In 2019, she played Lizzie Wiley in the Channel 5 mini drama Cold Call. She also played characters called Rose in Mister Runner and Werewolf in 2020 and appeared in the radio drama Teatime. In 2021, Redford played social worker Jane in the BBC comedy Alma's Not Normal and in 2022 appeared as Jill the Phone Woman in the episode of Not Going Out titled "Jury".

Redford began writing in between acting jobs and is a member of the BBC Writersroom Comedy Room. Redford wrote her first audio drama, Yellow Lips which debuted on BBC Radio 4 in 2021 and follows a daughter's memories of her mum's struggle with mental health. In 2022, Redford wrote a play called Tapped which was described in The Guardian newspaper as "episodic-TV quality, with some amusing dialogue and interesting narrative turns" and was rated three out of five stars.

Filmography

References

External links

1989 births
Living people
British television actresses
English soap opera actresses
21st-century British actresses
English writers